NA-131 Kasur-I is a constituency for the National Assembly of Pakistan.

Members of Parliament

2018-2022: NA-137 Kasur-I

Election 2002 

General elections were held on 10 Oct 2002. Sardar Tufail Ahmad Khan of PML-Q won by 39,781 votes.

Election 2008 

General elections were held on 18 Feb 2008. Rao Mazhar Hayat Khan of PML-N won by 58,832 votes.

Election 2013 

General elections were held on 11 May 2013. Salman Hanif of PML-N won by 75,694 votes and became the  member of National Assembly.

Election 2018 

General elections were held on 25 July 2018.

See also
NA-130 Lahore-XIV
NA-132 Kasur-II

References

External links 
 Election result's official website
 General Election 2013 Official

Kasur